The title Best in Show is awarded annually to the dog chosen as winner of the Crufts dog show, according to conformation show rules. This title was first awarded in 1928, the initial winner being Primley Sceptre, a fawn Greyhound. Previously, Crufts had used the title "Best Champion", sponsored by the Illustrated Kennel News, which was awarded from 1905 to 1914. The first winner of Best Champion was Ch. The Sable Mite, a Pomeranian. According to Crufts: The Official History the first winner of that award was the first dog to be considered the "best" at a Crufts show, although it only lists winners between 1906 and 1912.

When Best Champion was introduced at Crufts in 1905, it was seen by Charles Cruft as an extension of the other titles already available at the show. The class was one of several classes reserved for Crufts subscribers at the cost of a guinea per year. Because of the restriction in entry, there were years when the winner of Best Champion was defeated in other classes which were not restricted to subscribers. Crufts was not the first dog show in the UK to introduce this type of title, the first event to do so was at the Cambridge Canine Society Show in 1900.

The change to Best in Show was considered by the press to be of little significance and was not promoted by Charles Cruft, and did not require a dog to have won its Best of Breed class until 1936. It did however remove restrictions on entry, which remained until the mid-1960s when entry to Crufts was restricted to dogs who had already become a champion by gaining championship points at other dog shows.

The most successful breed in the modern era since Best in Show was introduced has been the English Cocker Spaniel. Of the breed's seven show titles, all but one of them were owned and bred by Herbert Summers Lloyd (known predominantly as H. S. Lloyd) from the "of Ware" kennel. Only four dogs have won Best in Show on more than one occasion, and on three of these occasions they were English Cocker Spaniels owned by Lloyd. The fourth occasion was a Labrador Retriever named Bramshaw Bob, owned by Countess Lorna Howe who is the second most successful breeder in the show's history as she also won Best in Show once more with another Labrador in 1937, Ch. Cheveralla Ben of Banchory. Although no dog has won Crufts more than once since H. S. Lloyd's Tracey Witch of Ware in 1950, owner Jackie Lorimer won the title in 1993 with Irish Setter Sh Ch. Danaway Debonair and again with the dog's son, Sh Ch. Caspians Intrepid in 1999.

1905 to 1914

Best Champion
First awarded in 1905, it was listed as the 51st and last out of the members-only trophies on its introduction in the show schedule. The description of the award read, "AN ANTIQUE SILVER CUP, value FIVE GUINEAS, offered by the Proprietors of the "ILLUSTRATED KENNEL NEWS," for the best Champion of any breed in the Show. To be won outright."

1928 to present

Best in Show
Introduced in 1928, the prize was first described as "STERLING SILVER GOLD GILT 10-inch REPOUSSE ROSE BOWL. Decorated in flowers on circular base, for the best Dog in the Show. (OPEN TO ALL)".

During World War II, Crufts was not staged and in 1954, the dog-based competition was not held because of the electricians’ strike. In 2001, the canine festival was held in May, two months later than planned, because of the foot-and-mouth disease. The show was not held in 2021 due to the COVID-19 pandemic.

Most successful breeds
As of 2023

Most successful groups
As of 2023

See also
 List of Best in Show winners of the Westminster Kennel Club Dog Show
 List of individual dogs

Notes

A ^ Ch. Wishaw Leader was registered as a Scotch Collie, a breed now split into two breeds, Smooth Collie and Rough Collie.
B ^ Not held as the venue was requisitioned by the British Army for use as a warehouse for military equipment during World War I.
C ^ Not held due to World War II and the change of ownership of the show from the family of Charles Cruft to The Kennel Club.
D ^ The date of the event was moved from October to February, causing the event to skip a year.
E ^ The show was cancelled due to a strike by electricians.
F ^'^'^'^'^'^'^'^ The abbreviation Sh Ch stands for Show Champion, a title awarded to gundogs and Border Collies for winning three Challenge Certificates under three different judges with at least one of those Certificates being awarded when the dog in question is more than twelve months old.
G ^ The abbreviation Nord Ch. stands for Nordic Champion, which is awarded to a dog with a championship title from three different Nordic countries.
H ^' The abbreviation Aust Ch. stands for Australian Champion.

Citations

References

External links
Crufts Best in Show Roll of Honour on Flickr

Awards to animals
 *
Dog shows and showing
Lists of British award winners
Lists of dogs
United Kingdom-related lists